Percé is a small city near the tip of the Gaspé Peninsula in Quebec, Canada. Within the territory of the city there is a village community also called Percé.

Percé, member of the association of Most Beautiful Villages of Quebec, is mainly a tourist location particularly well known for the attractions of Percé Rock and Bonaventure Island. UNESCO Global Geoparks accredited Percé Geopark in 2018.

In addition to Percé itself, the town's territory also includes the communities of Barachois, Belle-Anse, Bougainville, Bridgeville, Cap-d'Espoir, Cannes-de-Roches, Coin-du-Banc, L'Anse-à-Beaufils, Pointe-Saint-Pierre, Rameau, Saint-Georges-de-Malbaie, and Val-d'Espoir.

Percé is the seat of the judicial district of Gaspé.

History
The area was within the traditional homelands of the Mi'kmaq people, who called the place Sigsôg ("steep rocks" or "crags") and Pelseg ("fishing place"). In 1603, Samuel de Champlain visited the area and named the famous rock Isle Percée ("Pierced Island"). During the 17th century, the place was used primarily as a stop-over for ships travelling to Quebec.

Used as a seasonal fishing centre during the New France era, permanent settlement began in the early 19th century with the arrival of Irish, French Canadian, and Jersey natives. In 1801 the Parish of Saint-Michel-de-Percé was founded. Percé became the most important fishing location on the Gaspé Peninsula  after Charles Robin, a native of Jersey, began his fishing establishment. Old buildings of the Charles Robin Company can still be seen there.

In 1842, the geographic township of Percé was formed, and 3 years later, the place was incorporated as a township municipality.

In 1942, the Royal Canadian Navy made a decision to expand Direction Finding and wireless intercept at Cap D'Espoir to a 24-hour basis in order to provide more bearings on German U-boats and to intercept enemy radio traffic. The Department of Transport placed its facilities at the disposal of the RCN. On May 21/45, the Canadian Naval Service approved the closing down and disposal of Harbour Grace and Cap D'Espoir intercept stations.

In 1971, Percé was greatly expanded and gained ville (town) status when it amalgamated with these 5 surrounding municipalities (with year of original incorporation):
 Municipality of Barachois (1953)
 Municipality of Bridgeville (1933)
 Municipality of Cap-d'Espoir (1935)
 Municipality of Saint-Pierre-de-la-Malbaie N°1 (1876)
 Municipality of Saint-Pierre-de-la-Malbaie N°2 (1876)

Demographics 

Tourism

Percé Rock is a natural rock formation located close to the shore facing the town.  It is a natural tourist attraction for its size, colour, and unusual door-like hole at one end of the rock. It can be seen from any of the belvederes in the area including Mont Joli, Mont Sainte-Anne and Pic de l'Aurore. Tourists can walk up to the hole in the rock at low tide.

Bonaventure Island occupies an area of 4.16 square km facing the town of Percé.  It is populated by one of the most important gannet colonies in the world and many other species of birds such as puffins, cormorants and murres also use the island as a home and breeding ground.

Whale watching is also a popular attraction in local area, and most notably, North Atlantic right whales, one of the rarest whales, had begun to concentrate off Percé in 1995 (this species was used to be regarded as sporadic visitors into the Gulf of St. Lawrence until 1994, and gradual increases have been confirmed in the entire St. Lawrence since 1998), and Gaspe Peninsula has become the centre of sightings in St. Lawrence region.

Further inland from Percé lies Mount Blanc which has a deep crevasse, as well as many other belvederes that overlook Cannes-de-Roches.  Mount Sainte-Anne, with a height of 375 metres, provides views of the sea and, during times of good visibility, Miscou Island in New Brunswick can be seen.

Les Percéides, an annual film festival in Percé, screens a weeklong series of films at various venues in the town, climaxing in an outdoor gala screening on the public beach.

Transportation

Percé can be accessed via Route 132, coming either from the north or the south. It is also reachable by air from the nearby Du Rocher-Percé Airport via private or charter aircraft - there is no scheduled air service to this airport. There was a rail link to Montreal, but that service was suspended in 2013, and there has been no indication of a resumption.

Another high hill, Mont-Blanc, has views of the region.

In the coastal waters, visitors can observe various species of marine mammals, such as seals and whales. The region is home to thousands of marine birds, which crowd the rocks of the Parc national de l’Ile-Bonaventure-et-du-Rocher-Percé facing of the town, just 3.2 kilometres off the coast of Percé.

Local government
List of former mayors:

 Georges Mamelonet (2003–2008)
 Denis Cain (2009–2009)
 Bruno Cloutier (2009-2013)
 André Boudreau (2013-2017)
 Cathy Poirier (2017–present)

See also
 List of cities in Quebec

References

External links

Official tourism site of Percé

Towns and villages of the Gaspé peninsula

Populated coastal places in Canada
Incorporated places in Gaspésie–Îles-de-la-Madeleine
Cities and towns in Quebec
Articles containing video clips